Sacol is an island in Zamboanga City, Philippines.

See also 
 List of islands of the Philippines

References

External links
 Sacol Island at OpenStreetMap

Islands of Zamboanga City